The 1918–19 Bucknell Bison men's basketball team represented Bucknell University during the 1918–19 NCAA men's basketball season. The head coach was Henry Benfer, coaching the Bison in his first season.The Bison's team captain was Andrew Mathieson.

Schedule

|-

References

Bucknell Bison men's basketball seasons
Bucknell
Bucknell
Bucknell